The Lake Oswego Transit Center is a transit center operated by TriMet, at 4th Street and A Avenue in Lake Oswego, Oregon.

The following bus routes serve the transit center:
 35 – Macadam/Greeley
 36 – South Shore
 37 – Lake Grove
 78 – Beaverton/Lake Oswego

In 2002, an overhaul was planned due to the proliferation of pedestrian obstacles. At that time, the four bus lines serving the center picked up 593 passengers and dropped off 505 on an average weekday.

Low ridership for two of the four bus lines serving the transit center (the 36 and 37, connecting Lake Oswego with Tualatin) was a concern for TriMet in the 2000s.

See also
 List of TriMet transit centers
 Willamette Shore Trolley, a nearby rail corridor that has been considered for extension of light rail or streetcar service from Portland to Lake Oswego

References

External links
Lake Oswego Transit Center – TriMet page

Lake Oswego, Oregon
Transportation in Clackamas County, Oregon
TriMet transit centers